Soldier Studies: Cross-Dressing in the Wehrmacht is a 2018 book by Martin Damman about cross-dressing male soldiers in the German armed forces during the Nazi period.

History
The book features a compilation of images with little text.

See also
 Wartime cross-dressing
 Bibliography of works on wartime cross-dressing

References

External links
 Soldier Studies Cross-Dressing in der Wehrmacht on the Hatje Cantz Verlag website

Cross-dressing in literature
Cross-dressing and the military
History books about Nazi Germany
LGBT in Nazi Germany
Transgender history in Germany
Wehrmacht